Richard Throssel (1882–1933) was a Cree photographer, who documented life on the Crow Reservation at the beginning of the 20th century.

Background
Richard Throssel was born in Marengo, Washington Territory in 1882. Throssel is best known for his photographs of the Crow Reservation from 1902-1911. These photographs of the Crows, which cover ceremonies, dances, scenes of everyday life, as well as individual and group portraits, are not only priceless historical documents they are, very simply, beautiful photographs. Though Throssel was not Crow, his quarter blood of Canadian Cree heritage and 1906 adoption into the Crow Nation afforded him intimate moments, which non-Indian photographers could not experience with the Crow People of Montana.

After a long bout with rheumatism, it was recommended he live in a drier climate. At the age of twenty, Throssel moved to the Crow Reservation in Montana as a clerk for the Indian Services office. He was exposed to the outstanding art environment that existed on the Crow Reservation. Throssel observed stunning Crow beading, narrative ledger art, and the paintings and photographs of non-Native American artists, Joseph Henry Sharp and Edward S. Curtis. Through painting lessons with Sharp, Throssel learned not only technique; he acquired the principles of design and composition.

Career
Throssel began to photograph shortly after arriving on the Crow Reservation, but it was not until 1905 that "Throssel submitted his first set of photographs, twenty-nine in number, for copyright." This same year Throssel met ethnographer and photographer Edward S. Curtis.  Curtis' influence on Throssel was apparent in Throssel's 1907 set of copyrighted images.  In this series Throssel employed vivid lighting with sometimes-staged arrangements, lending towards a much more sentimental view of Crow life.  Throssel was also well known for his photographs of "Crow couples, families and children, which are especially striking as the love and warmth expressed by the families are so contrary to how we normally see Native men, women, and children depicted in early photography" (Alison 235).  Even though Throssel was part of the early cliché style of depicting Native Peoples his approach also lent itself towards photographs of subjects caught in the moment.  The Indian subjects of his photographs expressed a sense of familiarity that cannot be found in the work of non-Indian photographers.

Throssel continued to photograph the Crow Nation for the Wanamaker Expedition of 1908 and the Indian Service in 1909.  After resigning as photographer for the Indian Service, Throssel with his wife of five years moved to Billings, Montana to open up his own commercial photography business, The Throssel Photographic Company. It was here that he organized a brochure of his photographs, which he was renowned for entitled Western Classics.

In less than a decade, Throssel built a personal collection of nearly 1,000 photographs, including 180 portraits of Crow people, 99 portraits of other American Indians, 186 tipi scenes, 63 Crow sacred and secular ceremonial images, and 352 images of daily life among the Crows of Montana In 1917, after a successful career as an artist, Throssel was twice elected Yellowstone County's representative to the Montana Legislature. Throssel's interest in politics continued until his death in 1933.

Notes

References
Albright P. Crow Indian Photographer: The Work of Richard Throssel. Albuquerque: University of New Mexico Press, 1997. .

External links
The Outsider and the Native Eye: The Photographs of Richard Throssel
Richard A. Throssel: Photographer of the Crows

1882 births
1933 deaths
Cree people
Crow tribe
Native American photographers
Artists from Montana
20th-century American photographers